Gallurese is a Romance language from the Italo-Dalmatian family spoken in the region of Gallura, northeastern Sardinia. It is sometimes considered a dialect of southern Corsican or a transitional language between Corsican and Sardinian.  "Gallurese International Day" takes place each year in Palau (Sardinia) with the participation of orators from other areas, including Corsica.

Gallurese morphology and vocabulary are close to southern Corsican, especially the dialects of Sartene and Porto-Vecchio, whereas its phonology and syntax are similar to those of Sardinian. One third of Gallurese vocabulary is also influenced by Logudorese Sardinian, Catalan, and Spanish.

The Sassarese language, spoken in the area of Sassari, shares similar transitional traits between Tuscan, Corsican and Sardinian but, in comparison with Gallurese, is definitely closer to the Logudorese dialects of Sardinian.

History 
The most ancient literary sources in Gallurese date back to the early 17th century, mainly as poetry and religious odes. Some late Middle Age fragments suggest that the formation of the language could be dated to the early 15th century. The origin and the development of Gallurese are debated. Max Leopold Wagner and Maurice Le Lannou argued that successive migration waves from Southern Corsica, promoted under the Aragonese rule to repopulate an area devastated by famine and pandemics, were crucial in the formation of a transitional language.

Typical constitutional elements of Gallurese 

the plural form of nouns in -i (ghjanni or polti 'doors') are like in Corsican and Italian, and not as in -s like in Sardinian (jannas, portas), French, Spanish, Catalan, etc.
 Latin 'll' has become -dd- (like casteddu, coraddu 'castle', 'coral'), the same as in Sardinian, southern Corsican and Sicilian (but castellu, corallu in northern Corsican);
-r- modified to -l- (poltu 'port', while portu in Corsican and Sardinian);
-chj- and -ghj- sounds (ghjesgia 'church', occhji 'eyes'), like in Corsican, while Sardinian is cresia, ogros.
 articles lu, la, li, like in ancient Corsican dialects (u, a, i in modern Corsican, su, sa, sos, sas in Sardinian);

Relation to Corsican 
Gallurese is classified by some linguists as a dialect of Corsican, and by others as a dialect of Sardinian. In any case, a great deal of similarity exists between Southern Corsican dialects and Gallurese, while there is relatively more distance from the neighbouring Sardinian varieties.

Concluding the debate speech, the Sardinian linguist Mauro Maxia stated as follows:

The Regional Government of Sardinia has recognized Gallurese, along with Sassarese as separate languages, distinct from Sardinian.

Sample of text
An excerpt from a hymn dedicated to the Virgin Mary.

See also 
 Sardinia
 Corsican language
 Sassarese
 Sardinian language

References

External links

Maxia, Mauro. Studi sardo-corsi: Dialettologia e storia della lingua tra le due isole. Accademia della Lingua Gallurese; Istituto di Filologia (2010).
Elementi di grammatica gallurese, Antoninu Rubattu
Von Wartburg, Walther. La fragmentation linguistique de la Romania.  Paris, Librairie C. Klincksieck, 1967.

Sardinian language
Corsican language
Languages of Sardinia
Languages of Italy
Dialects of Italian
Definitely endangered languages